Cobb is an unincorporated community in St. Clair County, in the U.S. state of Missouri.

History
The community was so named on account of corn cobs a local farmer fed his animals, according to local history. Variant names were "Howards Mill" and "Ritchie Mill". A post office called Howard's Mills was in operation from 1854 until 1886, and the post office was called Cobb from 1889 until it was discontinued in 1918.

References

Unincorporated communities in St. Clair County, Missouri
Unincorporated communities in Missouri